The Walloon Front for the Unity and Freedom of Wallonia (FW) was a political party in Belgium.

History
The FW was established by former Belgian Socialist Party member Robert Moreau on 19 January 1964. In the 1965 general elections the party received 0.5% of the vote and won a single seat in the Chamber of Representatives. On 26 June 1965 it merged with the Walloon Workers' Party, the Walloon Democratic Rally and the Wallon Democratic Front to form the Walloon Party, the forerunner to the Walloon Rally.

In 2013 a new Walloon Front party was established to participate in the 2014 elections.

References

Political parties established in 1964
Political parties disestablished in 1965
Defunct political parties in Belgium